Leif Anderson (11 February 1925 – 17 November 1999), often known by the sobriquet Smoke Rings, was a Swedish jazz expert, journalist and radio personality. His radio show Smoke Rings – Swing och sweet med Leif Anderson was first broadcast on Sveriges Radio on 12 September 1960. The last programme was broadcast on 14 November 1999, a few days before Anderson's death; this was the 1,786th programme in the series, which thereby became the longest-running show in Swedish radio history.

Anderson had a characteristically hoarse voice, and in his radio programme he spoke a mixture of Swedish with a Scanian accent and English. He specialised in jazz music from the 1920s, 1930s and 1940s.

References

1925 births
1999 deaths
Swedish radio personalities
Jazz radio presenters
20th-century Swedish journalists